Shiprock Airstrip , also known as Shiprock Airport, is a public use airport located five nautical miles (6 mi, 9 km) south of the central business district of Shiprock, in San Juan County, New Mexico, United States.

This is one of six airports owned by the Navajo Nation; the others being Crownpoint Airport (0E8) in New Mexico, plus Chinle Airport (E91), Kayenta Airport (0V7), Tuba City Airport (T03) and Window Rock Airport (RQE) in Arizona.

Facilities and aircraft 
Shiprock Airstrip covers an area of 104 acres (42 ha) at an elevation of 5,270 feet (1,606 m) above mean sea level. It has one runway designated 2/20 with an asphalt surface measuring 4,840 by 75 feet (1,475 x 23 m). For the 12-month period ending April 13, 2009, the airport had 500 general aviation aircraft operations, an average of 41 per month.

References

External links 
 Aerial image as of 9 October 1997 from USGS The National Map
 

Airports in New Mexico
Transportation in San Juan County, New Mexico
Navajo Nation airports
Buildings and structures in San Juan County, New Mexico